= 2018 Adamawa and Taraba States attacks =

Massacres in 2018 in Nigeria

In 2018, several massacres occurred in central Nigeria (namely Taraba and Adamawa), supposedly by Fulani herdsmen gunmen. At least 50 were killed in all.

These were in several communities across the neighbouring states.
